Perry Como was Perry Como's 26th LP album for RCA Records, released in 1980.

Track listing 

Side One
"Not While I'm Around" (Stephen Sondheim)
"Regrets" (Barbara Wyrick)
"When" (George Fischoff)
"There'll Never Be Another Night Like This" (David Reilly, Anthony Bygraves)
"Love" (Gerard Kenny)

Side Two
"When She Smiles" (Jerry Liliedahl)
"The Colors of My Life" (Music by Cy Coleman, lyrics by Michael Stewart)
"Save Me the Dance" (Music by Luciano Angeleri, lyrics by Ervin M. Drake)
"Someone is Waiting" (Richard Ahlert, Ettore Stratta)
"You Are My World" (Paul Vance, Bobby London)

References

External links
Perry Como Discography

Perry Como albums
1980 albums
Albums produced by Mike Berniker
RCA Records albums